Bill McGuire was an Irish footballer who played as a defender during the 1930s.

McGuire was a part of the Bohemians amateur team of the 1930s.

He won full international caps for the Irish Free State making his debut against Holland alongside fellow Bohemian players Fred Horlacher, Paddy Andrews and Plev Ellis.

Honours
Bohemians
 FAI Cup: 1934–35

References

External links
 
 

Year of birth missing
Year of death missing
Republic of Ireland association footballers
Irish Free State association footballers
Association football defenders
Irish Free State international footballers
League of Ireland players
Bohemian F.C. players